Unterschneidheim is a municipality in the German state of Baden-Württemberg, in Ostalbkreis district.

History
In 1810 Unterschneidheim had 735 inhabitants, Oberschneidheim had 301 inhabitants, (total 1036 inhabitants).

In 1974 the municipalities Geislingen, Nordhausen, Unterwilflingen and Walxheim were incorporated, in 1975 Zipplingen and Zöbingen were also incorporated.

International relations

Twin towns – Sister cities
Unterschneidheim is twinned with:
 Volvic, France

Sons and daughters of the community 

 Franz Bühler (1760-1823), composer
 Karl Hahn (born 1937), born in Zipplingen, political scientist
 Paul Nagler (born 1925), born in Unterschneidheim, architect

References

Ostalbkreis
Württemberg